Rear Admiral Viliame Naupoto  is the commander of the Republic of Fiji Military Forces, appointed by President Ratu Epeli Nailatikau on August 1, 2015 to replace Commander Mosese Tikoitoga, which took command in early 2014. Naupoto later served as Commander since December 2015.

He joined the Republic of Fiji Military Forces in 1982 and served in the Fiji Navy. In 1994 he was the Captain of the newly commissioned RFNS Kula. During his time in the military, he served as the Commander of Fiji Navy, Director Finance and Logistics and Commander.

Previously, Naupoto served as Minister for Youth and Sports in 2012 in Fiji's interim government which took power in the wake of the 2006 coup. Also a former Commander of the Fijian Navy as well as a former Fiji Director of Immigration, the first post to which he was appointed on 8 January 2007 by the Public Service Commission on the advice of Interim Prime Minister Commodore Frank Bainimarama, who seized power in a military coup on 5 December 2006. He was later appointed as the Permanent Secretary for the Ministry of Fisheries and Forests in 2009.

Naupoto was appointed to replace Eroni Luveniyali, whom the Military suspended and later dismissed.  According to a Fiji Sun report on 9 January 2007, the appointment was made in defiance of a High Court order that Luveniyali be reinstated.

In an interview with the Fiji Sun published on 23 January 2007, Naupoto said that Fiji's immigration system was replete with loopholes that allowed illegal immigrants to enter the country easily. This fueled corruption in the country, he claimed.

References

Fijian civil servants
Fijian Navy officers
Living people
Fijian military leaders
I-Taukei Fijian people
Government ministers of Fiji
Year of birth missing (living people)